Val Ramos (born March 27, 1958, New York City) is a Nuevo Flamenco guitarist.

At the early age of 14, Ramos studied Flamenco guitar with Spanish (Malaga) Flamenco master Adonis Puerta in New York City. In 1981, he graduated from Ezra Stiles College at Yale University. He made his professional debut in the Disney Channel in 1985 and has since released three independent albums under the PIRAM Records label.

Some of his musical compositions are featured in the documentaries Puerto Rican Passages (1996 Connecticut Public Television) and Nuyoricans (2001 WNET Thirteen/PBS).

Discography
 Por mi camino  (2001 PIRAM Records)
 Boricuas Flamencos (1998 PIRAM Records)
 Olive Green Eyes (1995 PIRAM Records)

External links
Val Ramos' official website

1958 births
Living people
Flamenco guitarists
American musicians of Puerto Rican descent